Neocrepidodera norica is a species of flea beetle from Chrysomelidae family that can be found in Austria, Bosnia and Herzegovina, Croatia, Italy, North Macedonia, Romania, and Slovenia.

References

Beetles described in 1890
Beetles of Europe
norica